, also known by its French title "Les Couleurs Chantent" ("The Colors Sing"), is a song by Japanese musician Ringo Sheena. It was initially released digitally on April 30, 2013, and on May 27 released as one of the A-sides of her 14th single, along with the song "Kodoku no Akatsuki". The release date was the 15th anniversary of the release of Sheena's debut single "Kōfukuron" in 1998. The song was used as the theme song for the drama Kamo, Kyōto e Iku.: Shinise Ryokan no Okami Nikki.

Background and development 

In early 2012, Sheena's band Tokyo Jihen disbanded, and released a string of releases, including the extended play Color Bars, the live compilation album Tokyo Collection, the B-side collection Shin'ya Waku, and performed their farewell tour, Bon Voyage. On May 16, 2012, Sheena released her first post-Tokyo Jihen solo work, the digital single "Jiyū e Michizure." This song acted as the theme song for the TBS drama Ataru, starring Masahiro Nakai.

It was later revealed that Sheena was heavily pregnant with her second child during the single's release. As she did not feel it was appropriate to link single promotions with the birth of a child, she waited until her Tōtaikai concerts in November to reveal this.

Writing and production 

Sheena worked together with producer and guitarist Yukio Nagoshi on the song, as well as "Kodoku no Akatsuki". Sheena had previously worked with Nagoshi during her Ringo Expo concerts in 2008, and on the songs "Zero Chiten Kara," "Togatta Teguchi" and "Yokyō" on her solo album Sanmon Gossip (2009). Her previous Tokyo Jihen bandmate Ichiyo Izawa played the harpsichord on "Irohanihoheto." Bassist Hitoshi Watanabe had previously worked with Sheena as a member of Bōtoku Vitamin, one of the bands who performed on her album Utaite Myōri: Sono Ichi (2002). Drummer Noriyasu Kawamura previously worked with Sheena on her debut album Muzai Moratorium (1999).

"Irohanihoheto" is the first line of the Heian era Iroha poem, a poem which includes each kana syllable once. Sheena wrote the song after reading the script for Kamo, Kyōto e Iku.: Shinise Ryokan no Okami Nikki, the Fuji Television drama series she was asked to write a theme song for. She wanted to express the philosophy of being a mother.

Promotion and release 

"Irohanihoheto" was used as the theme song for the Fuji Television drama Kamo, Kyōto e Iku.: Shinise Ryokan no Okami Nikki. As such, it was used during the broadcast of the drama, as well as in promotional works such as commercials for the drama. During Sheena's Tōtaikai concerts in November 2013, Sheena performed "Irohanihoheto" live for the first time.

During the initial digital release, the song was given the French title "Couleurs Perfum" before being retitled "Les Couleurs Chantent".

Music video 

The Yuichi Kodama-directed music video was released on May 9, 2013. It features Sheena walking through a bamboo forest, wearing a light purple kimono. As she walks by, she walks past a procession of people wearing fox masks and traditional clothing. The video ends as she reaches a sunny spot in the forest, donning on her umbrella as rain begins to pour.

The video was nominated at the 2014 MTV Video Music Awards Japan for the Best Female Video award.

Critical reception 

Critical reception to the single was positive. OK Music reviewers felt "Irohanihoheto" had a catchy "1970s kayōkyoku-like melody" CDJournal reviewers felt that the song's rhythm and "air of impurity" resembled her 1998 single "Kabukichō no Joō", however the harpsichord and sitar gave the song an "oriental color". Billboard Japan reviewer Haruna Takekawa felt the song had a strong image of Kyoto, matching the drama. She believed the song was written about the "strength and beauty of women, and the impermanence of humanity." Rockin' On reviewer Daisuke Koyanagi felt that the song had a "simple kayōkyoku structure" that was completely different to her strong aesthetic sense in previous releases, and instead believed it was the song, not the arrangement, that was prominent. He theorised it was an attempt to go back to basics, and believed the song's introduction was intentionally similar to "Kabukichō no Joō".

Track listings

Personnel

Personnel details were sourced from "Irohanihoheto/Kodoku no Akatsuki"'s liner notes booklet.

Performers and musicians

Masato Abe – cello
Great Eida – concertmaster
Hirohito Furugawara – viola
Shigeki Ippon – contrabass
Akane Irie – violin
Ichiyo Izawa – harpsichord
Yuri Kaji – viola
Ayano Kasahara – cello
Tsukasa Kasuya – violin
Noriyasu Kawamura – drums
Nagisa Kiriyama – violin
Takashi Konno – contrabass
Ayumu Koshikawa – violin
Minoru Kuwata – violin
Erika Makioka – cello
Yoshihiko Maeda – cello
Kioko Miki – violin
Shōko Miki – viola
Mariko Muranaka – cello
Yukio Nagoshi – guitars, electric sitar
Yuki Nanjo – violin
Tatsuo Ogura – violin
Sachie Ōnuma – viola
Takayuki Oshikane – violin
Neko Saito – strings and percussion arrangement, conducting
Teruhiko Saitō – contrabass
Ringo Sheena – vocals, chorus, songwriting
Midori Takada – percussion
Kōjirō Takizawa – violin
Takashi Taninaka – contrabass
Seigen Tokuzawa – cello
Chizuko Tsunoda – violin
Leina Ushiyama – violin
Amiko Watabe – viola
Hitoshi Watanabe – bass
Yuji Yamada – viola
Daisuke Yamamoto – violin
Haruko Yano – violin
Tomoko Yokota – violin

Technical and production

Uni Inoue – recording engineer, mixing engineer
Shohei Kojima – assistant engineer
Kozo Miyamoto – assistant engineer
Shigeo Miyamoto – mastering engineer
Fumio Miyata – musician coordinator
Hiroshi Satō – assistant engineer
Yuji Tanaka – instrument technician

Chart rankings

Sales

Release history

References 

2013 songs
2013 singles
Japanese-language songs
Ringo Sheena songs
Songs written by Ringo Sheena
Japanese television drama theme songs
Music videos directed by Yuichi Kodama